Mount Elbert is the highest summit of the Rocky Mountains, the highest point in the U.S. state of Colorado, and the second-highest summit in the contiguous United States (after Mount Whitney). The ultra-prominent  fourteener is the highest peak in the Sawatch Range, as well as the highest point in the entire Mississippi River drainage basin.

The mountain was named in honor of a Colorado statesman, Samuel Hitt Elbert, who was active in the formative period of the state and Governor of the Territory of Colorado from 1873 to 1874. Henry W. Stuckle of the Hayden Survey was the first to record an ascent of the peak, in 1874. The easiest and most popular climbing routes are categorized as Class 1 to 2 or A+ in mountaineering parlance. Mount Elbert is therefore often referred to as the "gentle giant" that tops all others in the Rocky Mountains.

Geography
Mount Elbert is visible to the southwest of Leadville, often snow-capped even in the summer. Many other fourteeners surround Elbert in all directions, and it is very close to central Colorado's Collegiate Peaks. The neighboring Mount Massive, to the north, is the second-highest peak in the Rocky Mountains and the third-highest in the contiguous United States, and La Plata Peak, to the south, is the fifth-highest in the Rockies. Elbert's parent peak is Mount Whitney in California. Including Alaska and Hawaii, Mount Elbert is the fourteenth-highest mountain in the United States.

Weather conditions often change rapidly, and afternoon thunderstorms are common in the summertime; hailstorms and snow are possible year-round. An electrical storm on the mountain's summit was considered remarkable enough to be reported in the July 1894 issue of Science.

Geology

Mount Elbert is part of the Sawatch Range, an uplift of the Laramide Orogeny which separated from the Mosquito Range to the east around 28 million years ago. The tops of this range were heavily glaciated, leaving behind characteristic summit features and other such clues. For example, the base of Elbert on the eastern side exhibits large igneous and metamorphic rocks deposited when the glaciers receded, which lie on a lateral moraine. Further up the eastern side there is a large cirque with a small tarn. There are also lakes to both the north and south, Turquoise and Twin Lakes respectively; the Twin Lakes are a result of the natural dam of end moraines, and Turquoise Lake was created by the manmade Sugar Loaf Dam.

Mount Elbert is composed largely of quartzite. However, the summit ridge consists of metamorphic basement rock, which is Pre-Cambrian in origin and about 1.7 billion years old. There are various igneous intrusions including pegmatite, as well as bands of gneiss and schist. Unlike mountains of similar altitude elsewhere, Elbert lacks both a permanent snowpack and a prominent north-facing cirque, which can be attributed to its position among other mountains of similar height, causing it to receive relatively small quantities of precipitation.

History

The first recorded ascent of the peak was by H.W. Stuckle in 1874, who was surveying the mountain as part of the Hayden Survey.

The actual change was made in 1988 as a result of the North American Vertical Datum of 1988; it seems the original measurement resulted from the Sea Level Datum of 1929. A matter of some contention arose after the Great Depression over the heights of Elbert and its neighbor Mount Massive, which differ in elevation by only . This led to an ongoing dispute that came to a head with the Mount Massive supporters building large piles of stones on the summit to boost its height, only to have the Mount Elbert proponents demolish them. The effort was ultimately unsuccessful and Mount Elbert has remained the highest peak in Colorado. The first motorized ascent of Elbert occurred in 1949, when a Jeep was driven to the summit, apparently to judge suitability for skiing development.

Flora and fauna

The summit of Mount Elbert is an alpine environment, featuring plants such as Phacelia sericea (sky-pilot), Hymenoxys grandiflora (old-man-of-the-mountain), and Geum rossii (alpine avens). Also noted are Carex atrata var. pullata, Salix desertorum, Platanthera hyperborea, Thalictrum fendleri, Aquilegia canadensis, Chenopodium album, Gentiana detonsa var. hallii, and Bigelovia parryi. Below treeline the mountain is heavily forested, with the lower slopes covered with a mixture of lodgepole pine, spruce, aspen, and fir.

Some of the fauna reported on the climb to the summit include black bears, marmots, mule deer, pikas, and pocket gophers; there are also many species of birds. Elk, grouse, turkey, and bighorn sheep are present in the area during the summer. Grizzly bears are extirpated.

Climbing

There are three main routes to ascend the mountain, all of which gain over  elevation. The standard route ascends the peak from the east, starting from the Colorado Trail just north of Twin Lakes. The trail is open to equestrians, mountain bikers and hunters during season.

Even healthy and experienced climbers report great difficulty on this route, and despite the fact that there is a trail, the route is extremely steep, unstable, and rocky in places. The elevation gain is not evenly distributed over the 5.5-mile ascent. There are also routes approaching from the western face, and southwestern ridge, from South Halfmoon Creek Trailhead and Echo Canyon Trailhead respectively.

Although strenuous and requiring physical fitness, none of the conventional routes require specialist mountaineering skills or technical rock climbing. The main dangers of the mountain are those common to all high mountains, particularly altitude sickness. This can affect anyone, even those who are acclimatized. In serious cases, it can lead to high-altitude pulmonary edema and cerebral edema, which can lead to difficulties with breathing, paralysis, and death. Climbers are advised to begin their ascent at or before 6 A.M. and to summit and descend before early afternoon to minimize exposure to possible afternoon thunderstorms while at high altitudes. Although the most conventional form of ascent is by hiking, Anna Elizabeth Dickinson, the orator, ascended the mountain on a mule borrowed from the U.S. government.

See also

List of mountain peaks of North America
List of mountain peaks of the United States
List of mountain peaks of Colorado
List of Colorado county high points
List of Colorado fourteeners
List of U.S. states by elevation
List of the highest major summits of the United States
List of the most prominent summits of the United States
List of the most isolated major summits of the United States

Notes

References

Bibliography

External links

 
 
 
 
 
 

Mountains of Colorado
Mountains of Lake County, Colorado
Highest points of U.S. states
Fourteeners of Colorado
North American 4000 m summits